A floodgate effect is situation in which a small action can result in a far greater effect with no easily discernible limit.  The original analogy is that of a floodgate, which once opened, no matter how minutely, will allow water to flow from either side through the gate until both sides are balanced up.  It may also be used to refer to the effect where, once a floodgate has been opened, water will gush out in a torrent through the gate, making it easier to continue to open the gate, but harder to close it.

The term is commonly used to illustrate a situation where a precedent will set the stage for repeated performances, the number of which is hard to control. Such an example can be illustrated as follows:

The setting up of a redlight district here will create a floodgate effect, causing redlight districts to be set up elsewhere.

See also
 Floodgates principle

Social phenomena